Justice Redfield may refer to:

Isaac F. Redfield, associate justice of the Vermont Supreme Court
Timothy P. Redfield, associate justice of the Vermont Supreme Court